Route 485 is a  long west–east secondary highway in the southeast portion of New Brunswick, Canada.

The route's western terminus is at Route 126 in the community of Canaan.  The road travels northeast to the communities of Terrains de L'Évêque, Legereville and Sweeneyville before turning almost due east and intersecting with Route 490 between Gladside and McLean Settlement.

History

See also

References

485
485